The Diocese of the Isles, also known as the Diocese of Suðreyar, or the Diocese of Sodor, was one of the dioceses of medieval Norway. After the mid-13th-century Treaty of Perth, the diocese was accounted as one of the 13 dioceses of Scotland. The original seat of the bishopric appears to have been at Peel, on St Patrick's Isle, where indeed it continued to be under English overlordship; the Bishopric of the Isles as it was after the split was relocated to the north, firstly to Snizort and then Iona.

History
The diocese in its full form included the Outer Hebrides, most of the Inner Hebrides (including Iona, Skye, Raasay, Canna, Eigg, Coll, Tiree, Mull, Colonsay, Islay, Jura, Gigha – but not Lismore, Kerrera, Seil or Luing, all under the Bishop of Argyll), the Isle of Bute and the Isle of Arran, as well as the Isle of Man (Mann). The diocese may have originally contained Galloway, a suggestion thought to explain the possible attacks of Wimund on Bishop Gilla Aldan of Whithorn.

From the 11th century until the creation of the Archdiocese of Niðarós, Mann and the Isles appear to have been under the jurisdiction of the Archbishop of York. Thereafter, it was formally under Niðarós (modern Trondheim). The diocese was severed after the English acquisition of Mann in the 14th century.

In 1472, however, the Norwegian territories of Orkney and Shetland became Scottish, as part of the marriage settlement of King James III of Scotland, following which the Bishopric of St. Andrews was elevated to an archdiocese, and the Isles (but not Mann) came under her jurisdiction.

The Bishopric's links with Rome ceased to exist after the Scottish Reformation, but continued, apart from temporary abolition between 1638 and 1661, under the episcopal Church of Scotland until the Revolution of 1688. Episcopacy in the established church in Scotland was permanently abolished in 1689 but it continued in the now nonconformist Scottish Episcopal Church until 1702 with the death of Bishop Archibald Graham.  The diocese then came under the care of the Bishop of Ross or Caithness or Moray variously. A new united Scottish Episcopal Diocese of Argyll and The Isles was established in 1847 with Bishop Alexander Ewing as the first Bishop living at Lochgilphead.

Medieval parishes 
Source: Argyll Bute Inverness Ross. Man not included.

 Barra
 Barvas (Lewis)
 Benbecula
 Bracadale (Skye)
 Canna
 Coll
 Colonsay
 Duirinish (Skye)
 Eye or Stornoway (Lewis)
 Gigha & Cara
 Harris
 Howmore (South Uist)
 Inchkenneth (Mull)
 Iona
 Jura or Killearndale
 Kilarrow (Islay)
 Kilbride (Arran)
 Kilchoman (Islay)
 Kilcolmkill (Mull)
 Kildalton (Islay)
 Kildonan (Eigg)
 Kilfinichen (Mull)
 Kilmaluoc (Raasay)
 Kilmeny (Islay)
 Kilmore (Mull)
 Kilmory (Arran)
 Kilmuir or Kilmorie (North Uist)
 Kilmuir (Skye)
 Kilninian (Mull)
 Kilpeter (South Uist)
 Kilvickeon (Mull)
 Kingarth (Bute)
 Kirkapoll (Tiree)
 Lochs (Lewis)
 Minginish (Skye)
 Ness (Lewis)
 Rodel (Harris)
 Rothesay (Bute)
 Sand (North Uist)
 Sleat (Skye)
 Snizort (Skye)
 Soroby (Tiree)
 Strath (Skye)
 Torosay or Killean (Mull)
 Trumpan (Skye)
 Uig (Lewis)
 Uig (Skye)

Notes

References

See also
Bishop of the Isles, list of bishops of the Isles
Diocese of Sodor and Man

History of the Isle of Man
Pre-Reformation dioceses of Scotland
Religion in Argyll and Bute
Religion in Highland (council area)